The men's individual épée competition at the 2014 Asian Games in Goyang was held on 20 September at the Goyang Gymnasium.

Schedule
All times are Korea Standard Time (UTC+09:00)

Results

Preliminaries

Pool A

Pool B

Pool C

Pool D

Pool E

Summary

Knockout round

Final

Top half

Bottom half

Final standing

References
Men's Individual Epée Results

External links
Official website

Men Epee